The Senckenberg Institute of Pathology ( or Senckenbergisches Pathologisches Institut), formerly known as the Institute of Anatomical Pathology of the Senckenberg Foundation, is a pathological institute of the Goethe University Frankfurt.

It was founded in 1763 by Johann Christian Senckenberg as the Theatrum Anatomicum, as part of the Senckenberg Foundation. In 1914, the institute became part of the Goethe University Frankfurt.

Directors
 Karl Weigert 1885–1904
 Eugen Albrecht 1904–1908
 Bernhard Fischer-Wasels 1908–1941
 Arnold Lauche 1943–1959
 Wolfgang Rotter 1960–1978
 Martin-Leo Hansmann

References

Medical research institutes in Germany
Pathology organizations
Organisations based in Frankfurt
Medical and health organisations based in Hesse